The Essential Gandhi: An Anthology of His Writings on His Life, Work, and Ideas is a collection of Mohandas Gandhi's writings edited by Louis Fischer.  The book outlines how Gandhi became the Mahatma and introduces Gandhi's opinions on various subjects.  It is split into two parts, "The Man" and "The Mahatma".

The Man 
 Part One chronicles the transformation of a young man full of internal struggle into India's political and spiritual leader. Gandhi travels to England for his education and upholds his vow to abstain from meat, alcohol, and women. Gandhi displays both a sense of humor in his planned suicide and an obsession for perfection in his own dismay at his lust for his wife, Kasturbai.  Throughout this part of the book, the reader is shown subtle glimpses of the part of the rather unremarkable Mohandas K. Gandhi that will become the spiritual leader of India. Part One culminates in Gandhi's march into the Transvaal leading thousands of Indian laborers on strike.  The demonstration brought about reforms to the previously anti-Indian law code.

Indian biographies
Mahatma Gandhi
Ballantine Books books
1962 non-fiction books
20th-century Indian books
Books about activists